Staker is a surname. Notable people with the surname include:

 Brent Staker (born 1984), Australian rules footballer
 Robert Jackson Staker (1925–2008), jurist
 Steve Staker (1943–2020), American football coach

See also
 Staker Wallace (born 1733), member of the Society of the United Irishmen
 Stake (disambiguation)